1918 års fattigvårdslag (English: Poor Care Law of 1918) was a Swedish Poor Law which organized the public Poor relief in the Sweden.  It replaced the 1871 års fattigvårdförordning and was in effect until the modern Social Help Law of 1952.

The law was clubbed by the Swedish Parliament on 14 June 1918.  It replaced the Law of 1871, which had been very strict and complemented by abusive practices such as rotegång, the pauper auctions and child auction.

The law of 1918 reformed and humanized the entire social relief system in Sweden.  It transformed the old poor care system to a more modern social welfare law, expanded the right to social help to and reintroduced the right to appeal.  It abolished a number of practices associated with the old system, such as the rotegång, the pauper auctions, the child auctions, and transformed the old poor houses to retirement homes.

See also
 Welfare in Sweden

References
 Elisabeth Engberg, I fattiga omständigheter. Fattigvårdens former och understödstagare i Skellefteå socken under 1800-talet. [In poor circumstances. Poor relief policy and paupers in Skellefteå parish, Sweden, in the nineteenth century] Umeå 2005, 368 pp. Monograph.
 Hadenius, Stig, Nilsson, Torbjörn & Åselius, Gunnar, Sveriges historia: vad varje svensk bör veta, Bonnier Alba, Stockholm, 1996
 Sven Ulric Palme: Hundra år under kommunalförfattningarna 1862-1962: en minnesskrift utgiven av Svenska landskommunernas förbund, Svenska landstingsförbundet [och] Svenska stadsförbundet, printed at Godvil, 1962

Social history of Sweden
1918 in law
Social law
1918 in Sweden